Lee Connelly (born 18 October 1999) is a Scottish professional footballer who plays as a striker for Queen of the South.

Club career
Connelly began his career with Queen's Park before moving to Sunderland in 2016. Connelly's senior debut was on 9 October 2018, in the EFL Trophy, alongside Jack Diamond. Connelly moved on loan to South Shields in August 2019, for whom he made 2 appearances, and Alloa Athletic in January 2020. Connelly was loaned again to Alloa in September 2020.

Connelly was released by Sunderland at the end of the season, and signed for Queen of the South in June 2021.

On 5 September 2021, he scored his first goal for Queens in the club's 3–0 win over Broomhill at Palmerston Park in the second round of the SPFL Trust Trophy.

On 11 September 2021, he scored his first league goal for Queens in the club's 1–0 win over Raith Rovers at Stark's Park in the 12th minute.

On 15 June 2022, Connelly signed a one-year extension to his existing contract to remain with the Doonhamers.

On 30 July 2022, Connelly scored Queens first goal of the 2022-23 season, after only 20 seconds and was also sent off for violent conduct in the 85th minute, as the Doonhamers were defeated 4-1 versus Clyde at Palmerston. 

On 30 August 2022, Connelly scored Queens equaliser in the 17th minute at Ibrox, as the Doonhamers lost 3-1 to Rangers in the second round of the Premier Sports Cup, despite being a self-confessed Celtic supporter.

International career
Connelly has represented Scotland at youth international level.

References

1999 births
Living people
Scottish footballers
Queen's Park F.C. players
Sunderland A.F.C. players
Association football forwards
Scotland youth international footballers
South Shields F.C. (1974) players
Place of birth missing (living people)
Alloa Athletic F.C. players
Queen of the South F.C. players
Scottish Professional Football League players